The 79th Clifford Cup tournament was held between the 27 February and the 5 March 2014. The change in dates from the competition's traditional dates in the September/October period, resulted in there being no competition being played in 2013.

The final of the competition was held at Colombo Racecourse Sports Complex on the 5 March 2014 between Navy SC and Havelock SC. The last time these two teams met in a Clifford Cup final was in 1976, where it was the first time that Navy SC had played in a cup final and it was Havelock SC's tenth appearance. That game was won by Havelock SC, 15 points to 3. The last time Havelock Sports Club won the Clifford Cup was in 1981, whilst Navy had never won the cup. Havelock SC dominated the first half and went into the break with a lead of 19-3. Navy SC made a stunning comeback in the second half of the game to defeat Havelock SC by 27 (3 converted tries and two penalties) to 22 (three tries, two conversions and a penalty). Navy SC fullback Nuwan Hettiarachchi won the player-of-the-tournament award.

Seedings
The seeding is based upon the teams standings at the end of the 2013-14 Dialog Rugby League season. The first six seeds represent the teams in the Cup section of the league and the seventh and eighth seeds are the first two teams in the Plate section of the league.

 Navy SC
 Kandy SC
 Havelock SC
 Up Country Lions
 Ceylonese R & FC
 Army SC
 Police SC
 Air Force SC

Quarter finals

Semi finals

Final

References

2014
2014 rugby union tournaments for clubs
2014 in Asian rugby union
2014 in Sri Lankan sport